Nicolás Almagro and Carlos Berlocq were the defending champions, but Almagro chose not to participate this year and Berlocq chose to compete in Umag instead.

Wesley Koolhof and Matwé Middelkoop won the title, defeating Dennis Novak and Dominic Thiem in the final, 2–6, 6–3, [11–9].

Seeds

Draw

Draw

References
 Main Draw

Generali Open Kitzbuhel - Doubles
2016 Doubles